Antonio de Mendoza (1495 – 21 July 1552) was a Spanish colonial administrator who was the first viceroy of New Spain, serving from 14 November 1535 to 25 November 1550, and the third viceroy of Peru, from 23 September 1551, until his death on 21 July 1552.

Mendoza was born at Alcalá la Real (Jaén, Spain), the son of the 2nd Count of Tendilla, Íñigo López de Mendoza y Quiñones, and Francisca Pacheco. He was married to María Ana de Trujillo de Mendoza.

Viceroy of New Spain
Mendoza became Viceroy of New Spain in 1535 and governed for 15 years, longer than any subsequent viceroy. On his arrival in New Spain, he found a recently conquered territory beset with Indigenous  unrest and rivalry among the Spanish conquerors and Spanish settlers. His difficult assignment was to govern in the king's name without making an enemy of Hernán Cortés. Cortés himself had expected to be made the permanent ruling crown official of New Spain, since he had led the Spanish conquest of the Aztec Empire. The Emperor Charles V (King Charles I of Spain) and the Council of the Indies judged Cortés too independent of crown authority to be made viceroy and had created a high court (audiencia) in New Spain in 1528, appointing Nuño de Guzmán, a rival of Cortés as its president to counter Cortés's power. In 1530 the crown granted Cortés the title of the Marquis of the Valley of Oaxaca with multiple encomiendas. With the arrival of Viceroy Mendoza in 1535, Cortés pursued his own economic interests from his palace in Cuernavaca.

Although the Spanish had occupied and expanded explorations, conquest, and settlement in the Caribbean, it was not until the conquest of central Mexico that the crown appointed a viceroy (vice king), who would be the king's living image in Mexico and envisioned to effectively assert royal authority in the Kingdom of New Spain. To further cement his authority and establish a solid society he established marital alliances with powerful settlers committed to the development of New Spain, such as Marina de la Caballería. Mendoza's status as a noble and his family's loyalty to the Spanish crown made him a suitable candidate for appointment.<ref>Altman et al, Early History of Greater Mexico, p. 69.</ref>

Don Antonio and Bishop Juan de Zumárraga were key in the formation of two institutions of Mexico: the Colegio de Santa Cruz at Tlatelolco (1536), where the sons of Aztec nobles studied Latin, rhetoric, philosophy and music, and the Royal and Pontifical University of Mexico (1552), modeled on the University of Salamanca, which trained young men for the Catholic Church. These institutions were the first and second universities respectively to be established in the mainland of the Americas. In 1536 he began the minting of silver and copper coins, known as macuquinas. Also under his instructions, the first printing press in the New World was brought to Mexico in 1539, by printer Juan Pablos (Giovanni Paoli). The first book printed in Mexico: La Escala Espiritual de San Juan Clímaco. On 18 May 1541 don Antonio founded the city of Valladolid (now Morelia, Michoacán).

When the Spanish crown issued the New Laws that put restrictions on the grants of elite conquerors awarded grants of labor encomenderos, the viceroy prudently refrained from implementing the most draconian aspects of the edicts, which no longer permitted an encomendero family holding the grant in perpetuity.  In Peru, the implementation of the New Laws resulted in outright rebellion and the assassination of the viceroy.  In reaction to the crisis caused by the New Laws, Mendoza introduced the policy of obedezco pero no cumplo ("I obey but do not comply"), which means "I respect the authority of the crown, but in my judgment I do not implement particular legislation." He tried to not implement the New Laws, and therefore stabilized the region.

In 1542 an insurrection of the Indians, called the Mixtón Rebellion threatened to push the Spaniards out of northwestern Mexico, bringing the area under indigenous control. The Viceroy himself had to take the field and bring all disposable manpower. The rebellion was quashed and the surviving Indians were harshly punished. By the viceroy's order men, women and children were seized and executed, some by cannon fire, some torn apart by dogs, and others stabbed.  In 1548 he suppressed an uprising of the Zapotecs.

As viceroy, Mendoza commissioned the expedition of Francisco Vásquez de Coronado to explore and establish settlements in the northern lands of New Spain in 1540–42, the expedition of Juan Rodríguez Cabrillo to explore the western coastline of Alta California in 1542–43, and the expedition of Ruy López de Villalobos to the Philippines in 1542–43. The Codex Mendoza created by the order of Mendoza, and subsequently named for him.

During his term of office, Mendoza is credited with consolidating the sovereignty of the Crown throughout the Spanish conquests in New Spain and limiting the power and ambition of the first conquistadors. Many of the political and economic policies he established endured throughout the entire colonial period. He promoted the construction of hospitals and schools and encouraged improvements in agriculture, ranching and mining. His administration did much to bring stability and peace to New Spain.

He was succeeded as viceroy of New Spain by Don Luís de Velasco. It is reported that his advice to his successor was:  "Do little and do that slowly."

Viceroy of Peru
On 4 July 1549 in Brussels, Emperor Charles V named Mendoza viceroy of Peru. He traveled overland from Mexico to Panama, and then by boat to Peru. He arrived and took up his new office on 25 November 1550. However, he soon became ill, and died in 1552. His tomb is in the Cathedral of Lima, along with that of the Spanish conqueror of Peru, Francisco Pizarro.

Cape Mendocino in Humboldt County, California was named in his honor in 1565. From the cape, Mendocino County, the town of Mendocino, and Mendocino National Forest were named in the 19th and 20th centuries.

Notes

References
 "Mendoza, Antonio de," Enciclopedia de México, v. 9. Mexico City, 1988.
 "Mendoza, Antonio de," Encyclopædia Britannica, v. 6. Chicago, 1983.
 García Puron, Manuel, México y sus gobernantes, v. 1. Mexico City: Joaquín Porrua, 1984.
 Orozco Linares, Fernando, Gobernantes de México''. Mexico City: Panorama Editorial, 1985, .

Further reading

External links

"The First and the best: Viceroy Antonio de Mendoza"

Viceroys of New Spain
Viceroys of Peru
1495 births
1552 deaths
Ambassadors of Spain
Colonial Mexico
Colonial Peru
Encomenderos
People from Alcalá la Real
1530s in New Spain
1540s in New Spain
1550s in New Spain
1550s in the Viceroyalty of Peru
16th-century Mexican people
16th-century Peruvian people
16th-century Spanish people